"Don't Say Goodnight (It's Time for Love)" is a 1980 soul and quiet storm record by the Isley Brothers, released on their T-Neck imprint. The track was released as the first single from their 1980 platinum album, Go All the Way.

Song background
The song, which was released as an answer of sorts to Teddy Pendergrass' hit, "Turn Off the Lights", was an ode to love sung by Ronald Isley, who begs his lady in his trademark falsetto to give him her love, stating if "people say that love is for the giving/so lemme love you, girl".

Chart performance
The song was also their last Top 40 pop hit in 16 years, peaking at number 39 pop while reaching number one on the R&B singles chart.

Personnel
Ronald Isley: lead and background vocals
O'Kelly Isley Jr. and Rudolph Isley: background vocals
Ernie Isley: guitars, drums
Marvin Isley: bass
Chris Jasper: keyboards, piano, string synthesizers

References

1980 songs
1980 singles
The Isley Brothers songs
Songs written by Chris Jasper
Songs written by Ernie Isley
Songs written by Rudolph Isley
Songs written by O'Kelly Isley Jr.
Songs written by Ronald Isley
Songs written by Marvin Isley
Soul ballads
T-Neck Records singles
1980s ballads
Quiet storm songs